Andreas Maier is a retired American soccer player who played professionally in the USL A-League.

Maier attended the Rutgers University, playing on the men's soccer team from 1990 to 1994.  He then spent time in the German third division before returning to the United States in 1996 to play for the Tampa Bay Cyclones.  In 1998, he played for the Central Jersey Riptide.  On February 23, 1999, the Miami Fusion signed Maier as a discovery player.  The Fusion waived him on April 7, 1999, without Maier seeing any first team games.  He then joined the Hampton Roads Mariners where he played until 2000.  After spending time in Switzerland, he moved to the Nashville Metros.  He finished his career in 2002 with the Atlanta Silverbacks.

References

External links
 

Living people
1972 births
American soccer players
American expatriate soccer players
Atlanta Silverbacks players
Central Jersey Riptide players
Virginia Beach Mariners players
Miami Fusion players
Nashville Metros players
Tampa Bay Cyclones players
USISL players
USL First Division players
Association football midfielders